Rorschach Stadt railway station is a railway station in Rorschach, in the Swiss canton of St. Gallen. It is an intermediate stop on the Rorschach–St. Gallen line.

Services 
Rorschach Stadt is served by three services of the St. Gallen S-Bahn:

 : hourly service between Nesslau-Neu St. Johann and Altstätten SG
 : hourly service via Sargans (circular operation).
 : hourly service between Weinfelden and St. Margrethen.

References

External links 
 
 

Railway stations in the canton of St. Gallen
Swiss Federal Railways stations
Rorschach, Switzerland